Bakshino is a rural locality (a village) in Sidorovskoye Rural Settlement, Gryazovetsky District, Vologda Oblast, Russia. The population was 17 as of 2002.

Geography 
Bakshino is located 49 km southeast of Gryazovets (the district's administrative centre) by road. Bekrenevo is the nearest rural locality.

References 

Rural localities in Gryazovetsky District
Gryazovetsky Uyezd